is a form of Japanese street theater and storytelling that was popular during the Great Depression of the 1930s and the post-war period in Japan until the advent of television during the mid-20th century.  were performed by a  (" narrator") who travelled to street corners with sets of illustrated boards that they placed in a miniature stage-like device and narrated the story by changing each image.

 has its earliest origins in Japanese Buddhist temples, where Buddhist monks from the 8th century onward used  ("picture scrolls") as pictorial aids for recounting their history of the monasteries, an early combination of picture and text to convey a story.

History

Origins 
The exact origins of  during the 20th century are unknown, appearing "like the wind on a street corner" in the Shitamachi section of Tokyo around 1930. The scroll depicts anthropomorphised animal caricatures that satirise society during this period but has no text, making it a pictorial aid to a story.

During the Edo period (1603–1868), visual and performing arts flourished, particularly through the proliferation of ukiyo-e ("pictures of the floating world").  once again became popular during the later 18th century as storytellers began to set up on street corners with an unrolled scroll hanging from a pole. In the Meiji period (1868–1912),  ("stand-up pictures"), similar to those in the Edo period, were told by performers who manipulated flat paper cutouts of figures mounted on wooden poles (similar to the shadow puppets of Indonesia and Malaysia). The Zen priest Nishimura is also credited to have used these pictures during sermons to entertain children. Much smaller in size, six engravings of landscapes and everyday scenes would be placed one behind the other on top of the device and lowered when required so that the viewer, who looked at them through a lens, could experience the illusion of space created by this device.

Golden age 
, cartoons, and comics became substantially popular during the Great Depression of the 1930s and after the Japanese surrender to the Allied Forces in August 1945 at the end of the Second World War. Contrary to the hardships imposed by the Depression, in 1933 there were 2,500  in Tokyo alone, who performed ten times a day for audiences of up to thirty children, equalling a total of one million children a day. The Depression years were the most prosperous and vibrant for : with 1.5 million unemployed in Tokyo in 1930, it provided a great job opportunity for many people.

The early post-war period was particularly hard on the citizens of Japan who wanted to rebuild their lives in a rapidly changing environment. Comics became popular in newspapers and magazines, depicting scenes of everyday life injected with humour. Five million children and adults were entertained across Japan daily during the post-war period.

The  ("street-corner  storyteller") parked their bicycle at a familiar intersection and banged their  ("clapping sticks") together to announce their presence and create anticipation for the show. When the audience arrived they would sell sweets to the children as a fee for the show, which was their main source of income. True artists only used hand-painted original art, not the mass-produced kind found in schools or for other communication purposes.

 (dealers) were sought to commission and rent artwork to narrators for a small fee. The creation of these boards was similar to that of an American comic book company, with each person separately doing the colouring of a panel. The principal illustrator would make pencil sketches that were then done over with thick brushes of India ink. Watercolour paint was then applied to delineate the background and foreground, an opaque tempera paint was then added on top and lastly a coat of lacquer to give it shine and protect it from the elements. A mix of "trashy pop culture" and fine artistry,  blended the traditional linear style of Japanese painting with the heavy chiaroscuro of Western painting, contrasting light and dark to give the figures depth and dynamism.

Many prolific manga artists, like Shigeru Mizuki, were once  artists before the medium went out of vogue in 1953.

 was also utilized as a source of communication to the masses, an "evening news" for adults during the Second World War and the Allied Occupation (1945–1953). There are theories about the acceptance of drawing as a means to communicate in Asian nations more so than in Western nations which can be linked to the different printing technologies utilized in each regions histories. In the West, text and image eventually became separated because of the Gutenberg method of moveable type. In the Japanese language of complex characters, it was much easier to employ the woodblock printing. Such use was often related to propaganda.

Decline 
With television bringing larger access to a variety of entertainment, many  artists and narrators lost their work, with the former turning to drawing , bringing new talent and narrative to this growing genre. Although this Japanese art form has largely disappeared, its significance and contributions have allowed  to be attributed as an origin for manga.

Modern usage

As part of the Toyota Production System,  boards are used as a visual control for performing audits within a manufacturing process. A series of cards are placed on a board and selected at random or according to schedule by supervisors and managers of the area. This ensures safety and cleanliness of the workplace is maintained and that quality checks are being performed.

,  storytelling was being conducted as part of an ongoing campaign to promote world peace. Maki Saji (a Buddhist nun) created a  based on the story of one of the many children, Sadako Sasaki, who suffered as a result of the atomic bomb raid on Hiroshima in 1945. In May 2010, she was a delegate at a Meeting of the Treaty on the Non-Proliferation of Nuclear Weapons at the United Nations in New York, where she performed to promote a world in harmony and free of nuclear arms. 

A number of manga and anime have been produced that borrow from or call back to  tropes and presentation. Additionally, some older works that would later become popular manga or anime, such as GeGeGe no Kitaro, originally started as  programs.

See also

 Cantastoria
 Light novel
 Motion comic
 Puppetry
 Raree show
 Shadow play
 Slide show
 Stop motion
 
 Toy theater
 Visual novel

References

External links

 Atelier Kamishibai Artist Community
 Official Kamishibai Artist Forums
 ZiRKUSOFiA Cuentos y Talleres de Kamishibai.
 Doshin-sha kammishibai books 
 The International Kamishibai Association of Japan (IKAJA) 
 Kamishibai for Kids 
 Storycard Theater
 Kreashibai website and shop 
 Review of Manga Kamishibai: The Art of Japanese Paper Theater on PopMatters.com
 Entry in The Encyclopedia of Science Fiction
 Manga's story starts with kamishibai

Buddhist folklore
Japan in non-Japanese culture
Japanese culture
Japanese folklore
Performing arts in Japan
Storytelling
Japanese words and phrases